The following is a list of football stadiums in Iraq, ordered by capacity.

Current stadiums

Future stadiums
Stadiums which are currently in development include:

See also
 List of Asian stadiums by capacity
 List of association football stadiums by capacity

References

External links
 Goalzz.com
 Worldstadiums.com

 
Iraq
Football stadiums
Football stadiums